Almost Famous is a studio album by American hip hop group Living Legends. It was released in 2001. It peaked at number 28 on the CMJ Hip-Hop chart.

Critical reception
Nathan Rabin of The A.V. Club gave the album a favorable review, saying: "Living Legends' grandiose moniker may be ironic and self-deprecating, but Almost Famous should go a long way toward establishing the members of this oversized crew as legitimate underground hip-hop heroes."

Track listing

References

External links
 

2001 albums
Living Legends albums
Albums produced by Eligh